Henrik Schärfe (born 1968) is a Danish former professor at Aalborg University, where he directed the Center for Computer-mediated Epistemology within the
Department of Communication and Psychology at Aalborg University.

He has been known through the Hiroshi Ishiguro-inspired and Kokoro-built robot Geminoid-DK, built to resemble himself. The Geminoid-DK project landed him on the Time top 100 list of the most influential people in 2012.

References

External links
 Henrik Scharfes website at Aalborg University
 Henrik Scharfes personal website
 Geminoid-DK project website 
 Geminoid DK Mechanical Test, demonstration video on YouTube

1968 births
Living people
Academic staff of Aalborg University